McKim Observatory is an astronomical observatory owned and operated by DePauw University.  Built in 1884, it is located in Greencastle,  Indiana (USA).

It was listed on the National Register of Historic Places in 1978.

Donor 
The observatory is named after Robert McKim, who presented to the observatory a complete astronomical outfit at a cost of over $10,000.

McKim was born in County Tyrone, Ireland, on May 24, 1816, and died in Madison, Indiana, May 9, 1887. After completing his apprenticeship as a stonemason in Ireland, he emigrated to the United States, worked for a time in Philadelphia, and moved to Madison, Indiana, in 1837. In 1855, he left stone masonry and established himself in the coal business. Income from investments in real estate enabled him to make investments in manufacturing enterprises which did well.

McKim was always a lover of astronomical studies, and, after his investment income was sufficient, he purchased one of the best telescopes in the United States for a private observatory adjoining his residence. Besides De Pauw, public charities and other institutions of learning also benefited by his bequests.

See also 
List of observatories

References

External links
Greencastle Clear Sky Clock Forecasts of observing conditions covering McKim Observatory.
Topographical map from TopoQuest

Astronomical observatories in Indiana
DePauw University
Buildings and structures completed in 1884
University and college buildings on the National Register of Historic Places in Indiana
National Register of Historic Places in Putnam County, Indiana
Buildings and structures in Putnam County, Indiana